Zbigniew Bieńkowski (31 August 1913, in Warsaw — 23 February 1994) was a Polish poet, literary critic, translator and essayist.

Biography
Bieńkowski graduated in 1931 from the Gymnasium XX Marian in Bielany near Warsaw. From 1932 to 1939 he studied at the University of Warsaw both law at the Faculty of Law, as well as at the Faculty of Humanities. Bieńkowski received a one-year scholarship from the Sorbonne and moved to Paris in 1938.  In 1939 he moved to Italy and then to Yugoslavia, where he was caught by the outbreak of World War II. He returned to Poland during the Nazi occupation. He fought as a soldier for the Armia Krajowa, and participated in the Warsaw Uprising.

After the war he worked in the editorial department of the Rzeczpospolita daily, then in the weekly Odrodzenie and monthly Twórczość.

In 1960 he married Małgorzata Hillar.

Bieńkowski was a member of the Polish PEN Organization from 1966 to 1972.

The authors on which he focused as a translator include: Charles Baudelaire, Victor Hugo, Mikhail Lermontov, Saint-John Perse, Paul Éluard, and Jules Supervielle.

Selected works

References 

 

Warsaw Uprising insurgents
1913 births
1994 deaths
20th-century Polish poets
International Writing Program alumni